Amilcare Sgalbazzi (born 11 June 1955) is an Italian former professional racing cyclist. He rode in two editions of the Tour de France, seven editions of the Giro d'Italia and one edition of the Vuelta a España.

Major results
1975
2nd Overall Giro Ciclistico d'Italia
1979
1st Stage 18 Giro d'Italia
1982
9th Giro dell'Etna

References

External links
 

1955 births
Living people
Italian male cyclists
Cyclists from the Province of Cremona